BCPL may refer to:

Computer Science 
 BCPL, a programming language

Legislature 
 Board of Commissioners of Public Lands, a Wisconsin state agency

Public service 
 Baltimore County Public Library, a public library in the state of Maryland.